Jennifer Guevara Campos (born May 18, 1987) is a Puerto Rican beauty queen who represented Puerto Rico at Miss World 2007 in China placing in the Top 16 semifinalists of the pageant. She has learned to use sign language and helps coach deaf children. She stands 5'10". She competed in Miss Universe Puerto Rico 2012 representing Arroyo and placed 3rd Runner-Up. She later competed in Miss Continente Americano 2012 but failed to place in the semifinals.

References

External links

 

Miss World 2007 delegates
Living people
1987 births
People from Orocovis, Puerto Rico
Puerto Rican beauty pageant winners
Guevara